The European Union Act 2011 (c. 12), was an Act of the Parliament of the United Kingdom, requiring a referendum be held on amendments of the Treaty on European Union or the Treaty on the Functioning of the European Union. Introduced in the House of Commons by Her Majesty's Principal Secretary of State for Foreign and Commonwealth Affairs, William Hague on 11 November 2010, the Bill received its Second Reading by 330-195 on 7 December, and was passed by the Commons on 8 March 2011. The Bill was read a second time in the Lords on 22 March, after a hostile reception by Peers. The Act received Royal Assent on 19 July 2011.

The Act was repealed by the European Union (Withdrawal) Act 2018.

Background

The Bill was introduced before parliament as a reaction to the European Union (Amendment) Act 2008, which had in the United Kingdom and Gibraltar instituted the Treaty of Lisbon with no participation by the Labour Prime Minister of the day, Gordon Brown and with no referendum, although one had been promised in 2005 in the Labour manifesto.

The Conservative - Liberal Democrat Coalition Agreement pledged in 2010:
to "ensure that there is no further transfer of sovereignty or powers	over the course of the next Parliament";
to "amend the 1972 European Communities Act so	that any proposed future treaty	that transferred areas of power, or competences, would be subject to a referendum on that treaty"; and
to "examine the case for a United Kingdom Sovereignty Bill to make it clear that ultimate authority remains with Parliament".
The Queen's speech reaffirmed that legislation would be introduced "to ensure that in future this Parliament and the British people have their say on any proposed transfer of powers to the European Union".

The Act
The Act amended the European Communities Act 1972 to require that any future amendment of the Treaty on European Union or the Treaty on the Functioning of the European Union made by treaty, and any use of a passerelle provision, must be approved by an Act of Parliament at least; and that a referendum must be held across the United Kingdom and Gibraltar in any of various cases (listed in section 4 of the Act) where this would enlarge EU powers or reduce safeguards such as unanimous voting.

The Act also enabled ratification of a transitional protocol relating to the number of members of the European Parliament.

The sovereignty clause

On 6 October 2010, the Government announced that the Act would include a provision "to underline that what a sovereign Parliament can do, a sovereign Parliament can always undo". The clause, eventually enacted as section 18 of the Act provides that:
"Status of EU law dependent on continuing statutory basisDirectly applicable or directly effective EU law (that is, the rights, powers, liabilities, obligations, restrictions, remedies and procedures referred to in section 2(1) of the European Communities Act 1972) falls to be recognised and available in law in the United Kingdom only by virtue of that Act or where it is required to be recognised and available in law by virtue of any other Act."

With the repeal of the Act a new sovereign clause was added into the European Union (Withdrawal Agreement) Act 2020 to replace this clause.

See also
2016 United Kingdom European Union membership referendum
Costa v ENEL
Crotty v. An Taoiseach
Direct effect
Factortame
List of Acts of the Parliament of the United Kingdom relating to the European Communities / European Union
Primacy of European Union law
Referendums in the United Kingdom
Thoburn v Sunderland City Council
Van Gend en Loos v Nederlandse Administratie der Belastingen

References

External links
Bill as introduced
Passage of the Bill through Parliament

United Kingdom Acts of Parliament 2011
Acts of the Parliament of the United Kingdom relating to the European Union
2011 in the European Union
Repealed United Kingdom Acts of Parliament